Timo Plattel (born 12 March 1994) is a Dutch professional footballer who plays as a goalkeeper.

Career
Plattel began his career with FC Twente and made his professional debut on 5 May 2013 in a 1–1 draw against Heracles Almelo.

Plattel signed for Almere City FC on 1 March 2018 for the rest of the season.

References

External links
 
 
 
 Netherlands profile at Ons Oranje

Living people
1994 births
Sportspeople from Apeldoorn
Association football goalkeepers
Dutch footballers
Netherlands youth international footballers
Netherlands under-21 international footballers
FC Twente players
Almere City FC players
Eredivisie players
Eerste Divisie players
Derde Divisie players
Footballers from Gelderland
Jong FC Twente players
21st-century Dutch people